The Union of Soviet Socialist Republics competed for the only time at the Summer Paralympic Games in 1988. The country also competed for the only time at the Winter Paralympic Games that same year.

Soviet athletes won 21 gold medals, 20 silver and 15 bronze at the Summer Games, as well as two bronze medals at the Winter Games. The USSR's most successful Paralympian was Vadim Kalmykov, with four gold medals in track and field.

The only athlete to win a Paralympic medal for the USSR at the Winter Games was Valentina Grigoryeva, who won two bronze medals in cross-country skiing.

Medalists

Summer Games

Winter Games

See also
 Soviet Union at the Olympics

References